The Chennai International Airport Metro Station is a metro railway station on the Blue Line of the Chennai Metro. The station serves the Chennai International Airport and the neighbourhoods of Meenambakkam, Tirusulam, Pallavaram and Pammal.

The station is the only elevated airport metro station in India. The other airport metro stations in the country such as those in Delhi, Lucknow, Mumbai and the proposed ones at Bangalore and Hyderabad are underground. The station enables rapid transit connectivity with the airport, making Chennai the second city in India after Delhi to achieve this.

Construction
The foundation for the station was laid on 24 May 2012. While the architectural and structural design of the station will be carried out by AAI in consultation with Creative Group, the interiors of the station will be designed by CMRL. The time frame for constructing the metro station is 14 months and the work has been awarded to URC Construction Company Private Limited, Erode, at a cost of  480 million.

By the end of July 2014, the structural work on the station was completed.

The station
The station building is a five-level terminal with a basement, ground floor, metro ground floor, concourse, and a platform. The station spans 17,300 square meters. To help passengers alight directly from the international and domestic terminals, the concourse of the station will be linked to the glass connector tube that will connect the two terminals. The station will be an RCC shell structure building with self-supported secret fix aluminium roofing.

The station is one of the few in the corridor that will have parking facilities.

Station layout

Traffic
As of December 2019, about 9,000 passengers board trains at the metro station, up from about 6,500 passengers in February 2019, making it the third busiest Metro stations in Chennai, after Thirumangalam and Chennai Central.

See also

 List of Chennai metro stations
 Chennai International Airport
 IGI Airport metro station

References

External links
Official Website for Chennai Metro Rail Limited

Chennai Metro stations
Airport railway stations in India
Railway stations in Chennai
2015 establishments in Tamil Nadu
Transport in Chennai
Airport rail links in India
25 kV AC railway electrification
Standard gauge railways in India
Railway stations in India opened in 2015